Mostafa Hashemitaba, an independent nominee for the 2017 Iranian presidential election launched his campaign in April 2017.
On 17 May 2017, Hashemitaba withdrew and endorsed Hassan Rouhani.

References 

2017 Iranian presidential election
Election campaigns in Iran